The Diocese of Saint Thomas in the Virgin Islands is a Latin Church ecclesiastical territory or diocese of the Catholic Church on the Caribbean, comprising the United States overseas dependency of the U.S. Virgin Islands, specifically the islands Saint Thomas, Saint Croix and Saint John. The Diocese of Saint Thomas is the sole suffragan diocese in the ecclesiastical province of the metropolitan Archdiocese of Washington. Bishops of Saint Thomas are members of the United States Conference of Catholic Bishops and also hold observer status with the Antilles Episcopal Conference.

History
The Diocese of Saint Thomas was erected as the Territorial Prelature of the Virgin Islands on April 30, 1960. Its name was changed and was elevated to a diocese on April 20, 1977. It is the only suffragan see of the Archdiocese of Washington. The diocese is governed from Charlotte Amalie on the island of Saint Thomas by a bishop whose episcopal seat is the Cathedral of Saints Peter and Paul. The current bishop is Jerome Feudjio, since March 2, 2021.

Bishops
The list of bishops of the diocese and their years of service:

Apostolic Prefect of the Virgin Islands
 Edward John Harper (1960–1977)

Bishops of Saint Thomas
 Edward John Harper (1977–1985)
 Seán Patrick O'Malley (1985–1992), appointed Bishop of Fall River and later Bishop of Palm Beach, Archbishop of Boston, and President of the Pontifical Commission for the Protection of Minors (elevated to Cardinal in 2006)
 Elliot Griffin Thomas (1993–1999)
 George Murry (1999–2007), appointed Bishop of Youngstown
 Herbert Bevard (2008–2020)
 Jerome Feudjio (2021–present)

Coadjutor Bishops
 Seán Patrick O'Malley (1984–1985)
 George Murry (1998–1999)

Other priest of this diocese who became bishop
 Adalberto Martínez Flores (priest here, 1985-1993), appointed Auxiliary Bishop of Asunción, Paraguay in 1997

High schools
 St. Joseph High School, Frederiksted, St. Croix
 Sts. Peter & Paul School, St. Thomas

See also

 Catholic Church by country
 Catholic Church in the United States
 Ecclesiastical Province of Washington
 Global organisation of the Catholic Church
 List of Roman Catholic archdioceses (by country and continent)
 List of Roman Catholic dioceses (alphabetical) (including archdioceses)
 List of Roman Catholic dioceses (structured view) (including archdioceses)
 List of the Catholic dioceses of the United States

References

External links
Roman Catholic Diocese of St. Thomas Official Site

 
Roman Catholic dioceses in the Caribbean
Roman Catholic dioceses in the United States
Roman Catholic Ecclesiastical Province of Washington
 
Roman Catholic
Roman Catholic dioceses and prelatures established in the 20th century
1960 establishments in the United States Virgin Islands